The 2018–19 Rugby Europe International Championships is the European Championship for tier 2 and tier 3 rugby union nations. The 2018–19 season is the third of its new format and structure, where all Levels play on a one-year cycle, replacing the old format of a two-year cycle, with the teams playing each other both home and away.

After the eligibility controversy of the 2018 Championship season, and the following points deduction, Romania faced and defeated Portugal in the relegation play-off to determine the last competitor for the 2019 Championship edition.

Countries

Pre-tournament World Rugby rankings in parentheses. Trophy as of 24 September 2018, Conferences as of 8 October 2018 and Championship rankings as of 4 February 2019. After winning the relegation play-off between the winner of the 2018 Trophy, Portugal, and the last placed 2018 Championship team, Romania, and the win by the latter Portugal remained on the Trophy level, whereas Romania stayed inside the Championship. Following the 2017–18 season and the promotion of Bulgaria as well as the relegation of Estonia, Rugby Europe reallocated Austria from Conference 2 South to Conference 2 North for the 2018–19 Conference season.

Championship
    (25)
  * (13)
    (26)
    (19)
    (21)
  ‡ (18)

Conference 1 
North
    (68)
  ↑ (64)
  ↓ (44)
    (56)
    (37)

Conference 2
North
    (75)
    (79)
    (99)
  ↓ (59)
    (96)

Development
  ↓ 
 

Trophy
    (32)
  ↑ (34)
    (27)
    (35)
  • (24) 
    (33)

South
    (71)
    (55)
  ↑ (NR)
    (58)
  • (40)

South
  ↓ (70)
  ↑ (94)
    (82)
  ‡ (NR)
    (77)

Legend:* Champion of 2017–18 season; ↑ Promoted from lower division during 2017–18 season; • Division Champion but not promoted during 2017–18 season; ‡ Last place inside own division but not relegated during 2017–18 season; ↓ Relegated from higher division during 2017–18 season

2019 Rugby Europe Championship

2018–19 Rugby Europe Trophy

2018–19 Rugby Europe Conference

Conference 1

Conference 1 North

Conference 1 South

Conference 2

Conference 2 North

Conference 2 South

2019 Rugby Europe Development

Play-offs

Championship–Trophy promotion play-off

References

 
2018-19
2018–19 in European rugby union
Europe
Europe